Z. flavescens may refer to:

 Zebrasoma flavescens, a saltwater fish
 Zonosaurus flavescens, a plated lizard